The Building at 106–108 Inman Street in Cambridge, Massachusetts is one of a series of well-preserved Greek Revival duplexes on Inman Street.  This house was built in 1845, and features very straightforward Greek Revival styling, most notably in the pilasters that run the full two story height of the building, separating each of the front facade's bays. The building has a later Italianate porch sheltering the centered entrances.

The building was listed on the National Register of Historic Places in 1982.

See also
Building at 102–104 Inman Street
Buildings at 110–112 Inman Street
National Register of Historic Places listings in Cambridge, Massachusetts

References

Houses on the National Register of Historic Places in Cambridge, Massachusetts
Houses completed in 1845
Greek Revival architecture in Massachusetts